In United States patent law, utility is a patentability requirement. The majority of inventions are usually not challenged as lacking utility, but the doctrine prevents the patenting of fantastic or hypothetical devices such as perpetual motion machines.

The patent examiners guidelines require that a patent application expresses a specific, credible, and substantial utility. Rejection by an examiner usually requires documentary evidence establishing a prima facie showing that there is no specific, substantial, and credible utility.

European patent law does not consider utility as a patentability criterion. Instead, it requires that to be patentable an invention must have industrial applicability.

Utility criteria 
In considering the requirement of utility for patents, there are three main factors to review: operability of the invention, a beneficial use of the invention, and practical use of the invention.

Operability
The importance of operability as a requirement of claims is disputed.

Janice Mueller claims that an inoperable invention may fail to satisfy the enablement requirement under 35 U.S.C. § 112 because "an inventor cannot properly describe how to use an inoperable invention...." However, as authority Ms. Mueller's textbook cites to another textbook, Landis on Mechanics of Patent Claim Drafting, which itself cites section 2173.05(l) in the Manual of Patent Examining Procedure.  Section 2173.05(l) has not been part of the Manual of Patent Examining Procedure since the 1990s.  The most recent pronouncement of the Manual of Patent Examining Procedure is 2107.01:

Situations where an invention is found to be "inoperative" and therefore lacking in utility are rare, and rejections maintained solely on this ground by a Federal court even rarer. In many of these cases, the utility asserted by the applicant was thought to be "incredible in the light of the knowledge of the art, or factually misleading" when initially considered by the Office. ... Other cases suggest that on initial evaluation, the Office considered the asserted utility to be inconsistent with known scientific principles or "speculative at best" as to whether attributes of the invention necessary to impart the asserted utility were actually present in the invention. ... However cast, the underlying finding by the court in these cases was that, based on the factual record of the case, it was clear that the invention could not and did not work as the inventor claimed it did. Indeed, the use of many labels to describe a single problem (e.g., a false assertion regarding utility) has led to some of the confusion that exists today with regard to a rejection based on the "utility" requirement.

Beneficial utility
Beneficial utility became established as a requirement in United States patent law in 1817 as a result of Lowell v. Lewis (1 Mason. 182; 1 Robb, Pat. Cas. 131 Circuit Court, D. Massachusetts. May Term. 1817.).  The utility criterion established by this case is, as Justice Joseph Story wrote in the Court's decision, that, to be patentable, an invention must be "useful" and must "not be frivolous or injurious to the well-being, good policy, or sound morals of society".  In spite of this ruling however, patents continued to be granted for devices that could be deemed immoral (e.g. gambling devices, see, e.g., Brewer v. Lichtenstein and Ex parte Murphy) or deceitful (see, Juicy Whip, Inc. v. Orange Bang, Inc. (dealing with a juice dispenser that arguably deceived the public into believing that the liquid seen in the attached reservoir was that which was being dispensed)).  In Juicy Whip, the Court of Appeals for the Federal Circuit put an end to the requirement: "Congress never intended that the patent laws should displace the police powers of the States, meaning by that term those powers by which the health, good order, peace and general welfare of the community are promoted…we find no basis in section 101 to hold that inventions can be ruled unpatentable for lack of utility simply because they have the capacity to fool some members of the public."(Juicy Whip Inc. v. Orange Bang Inc., 185 F.3d 1364, 1367–68, 51 USPQ2d 1700, 1702-03 (Fed. Cir. 1999), see also Manual of Patent Examining Procedure 706.03(a)(II))

Practical utility
The last utility category is practical or specific utility. According to Mueller, "to be patentable an invention must have some real-world use." The utility threshold is relatively easy to satisfy for mechanical, electrical, or novelty inventions, because the purpose of the utility requirement is to ensure that the invention works on some minimal level. However, the practical or specific utility requirement for patentability may be more difficult to satisfy for chemical compound inventions, because of the level of uncertainty when working with these compounds. The United States Supreme Court in Brenner v. Manson held that a novel process for making a known steroid did not satisfy the utility requirement because the patent applicants did not show that the steroid served any practical function. The Court ruled, "... a process patent in the chemical field, which has not been developed and pointed to the degree of specific utility, creates a monopoly of knowledge which should be granted only if clearly commanded by the statute." Practical or specific utility is the requirement for an invention to have a particular purpose.

History and development
The legal definition of what constitutes a useful invention established in Lowell v. Lewis remained the controlling definition of utility in United States patent law into the Twentieth Century, when it was superseded by the beneficial utility doctrine, which is defined to exclude from patentability anything immoral or deceitful. The United States Patent and Trademark Office and federal courts no longer consider beneficial utility nor the deceitful or immoral qualities of inventions, beginning with, for example, cases sustaining the patentability of a slot machine in 1977, and drink machines with decorative reservoirs that did not contain the drink actually dispensed. However, the USPTO and courts continue to consider whether or not an invention has a definable use at the time of application, excluding inventions that are not operable, a requirement of utility that the invention do what is claimed.

As a result of the new technologies and new fields from which patent applications come, the United States Supreme Court has fashioned a higher bar of utility, known as specific utility. In one case, the Court found that a steroid still in development was not useful in the sense used in the patent law, because it had no defined use at the time of the application. "A patent is not a hunting license," the Court stated. It is "not a reward for the search, but compensation for [the search's] successful conclusion." This standard for utility cannot be met until a "specific benefit exists in currently available form." In In re Brana, United States Court of Appeals for the Federal Circuit has ruled that utility requirement for biomedical invention does not require formal approval by the Food and Drug Administration.

Arguments against useless inventions include:
A patent for a useless invention is thought by some to be void at common law by others by force of the Statute of Monopolies which renders void grants of privileges which tend to the hurt of trade or are generally inconvenient. Now if a monopoly were allowed in a useless invention other persons would be prevented from improving it or turning it to any account whatever so that combinations of utility might be impeded. It would stand in the way of real inventors and hence be mischievous to the public generally.

Burden of proof during prosecution
During patent prosecution, the disclosed utility is presumed valid. The patent office bears the burden to disprove utility. The standard the USPTO uses is whether it is more likely than not that it would lack utility from the perspective of a person having ordinary skill in the art. If the examiner shows evidence that the invention is not useful, the burden shifts to the applicant to prove utility. The applicant can then submit additional data to support a finding of utility. The invention must possess utility at the time of application.

See also 
 Diamond v. Diehr
 Incredible utility
 Reduction to practice
 State Street Bank v. Signature Financial Group
 Sufficiency of disclosure
 Utility in Canadian patent law
 Utility model

Notes and references

External links 
 2107 Guidelines for Examination of Applications for Compliance with the Utility Requirement (USPTO website)

United States patent law